The Jade class comprised a pair of passenger ships intended to be converted into auxiliary aircraft carriers by Nazi Germany's Kriegsmarine during World War II. After the outbreak of war, the ships were requisitioned by the Kriegsmarine as transports, and in May 1942, plans were drawn up to convert them into aircraft carriers. The ships were not identical, but were similar enough in size to allow identical outfitting.

Gneisenau and Potsdam were to be renamed Jade and Elbe, respectively. Once converted, the ships were intended to operate twelve Ju 87 Stuka dive bombers and twelve Bf 109 fighters. Work on Jade was not started and the conversion project was abandoned in November 1942. She returned to service as a troopship, only to be sunk by a mine in the western Baltic. Elbe actually began the conversion process in December 1942, but only her passenger fittings were removed by the time work was halted in February 1943. She was converted into a barracks ship in Gotenhafen and seized by the United Kingdom after the end of the war. She remained in use until 1976, when she was broken up for scrap. A third ocean liner of the same class, was purchased by the Imperial Japanese Navy and converted into the escort carrier Shin'yō. Shin'yō was torpedoed and sunk in the East China Sea by a United States Navy submarine.

Conversion
Following the loss of the battleship  in May 1941, during which British aircraft carriers proved instrumental, and the near torpedoing of her sister ship  by carrier-launched aircraft in March 1942, the Kriegsmarine became convinced of the necessity of acquiring aircraft carriers. Work on the purpose-built carrier , which had been halted in April 1940, was resumed in March 1942. The Kriegsmarine also decided to convert a number of vessels into auxiliary aircraft carriers. Gneisenau and Potsdam had been built in the mid-1930s and operated by Norddeutscher Lloyd on its East Asia Service until the outbreak of war, when they were requisitioned by the Kriegsmarine as troopships.

The ships were found to have insufficient stability when converted into aircraft carriers. This was to have been remedied by the addition of side bulges and fixed ballast. The ballast was to have consisted of "concrete armor," a layer of concrete fitted to the sides of the hulls below the waterline. Conversion work on Gneisenau, which was to be renamed Jade, never began. The project was abandoned on 25 November 1942. The design for Potsdam, which was assigned the name Elbe, was reworked to correct the stability problems. The bulges and concrete armor were discarded and a second outer skin was substituted. Work began on the ship in December 1942; only the ship's passenger fittings were removed by the time work was halted on 2 February 1943. This was due to the resignation of Admiral Erich Raeder, the commander in chief of the Kriegsmarine, the previous month. Raeder had resigned in protest of Adolf Hitler's order that all surface ships be decommissioned and scrapped in the aftermath of the Battle of the Barents Sea.

Gneisenau was returned to troopship duties after the project was abandoned, but at 12:02 on 2 May 1943, she was sunk by a mine off Gedser. Potsdam was converted into a barracks ship in Gotenhafen, where she spent the remainder of the war. Following the German defeat, the ship was seized by the British on 20 June 1946 as a war prize, who commissioned her as a troop transport under the name Empire Fowey. She was sold to Pakistan, who operated her under the name Safina-E-Hujjaj until she was broken up for scrap in 1976.

Characteristics
Jade displaced , while Elbe displaced . The ships had steel-built, welded hulls with twelve watertight compartments and a double bottom. Jade was to have been crewed by 79 officers and 804 enlisted men, including 134 Luftwaffe personnel; Elbes crew arrangements are not known specifically, but would have consisted of approximately 900 officers and men.

Jade was powered by a pair of Deschimag geared steam turbines. The two turbines drove a three-bladed screw each. Steam was provided by four single-ended high-pressure boilers. Elbes propulsion system consisted of two electric drive motors powered by two turbo-generators. Each electric motor drove a four-bladed screw.

As converted, the ships were to be armed with several anti-aircraft guns. The heavy anti-aircraft battery consisted of eight  SK C/33 guns in twin mountings. The mounts were the Dopp LC/31 type, originally designed for earlier  SK C/31 guns. The LC/31 mounting was triaxially stabilized and capable of elevating to 80°. The guns fired fixed ammunition weighing ; the guns could fire HE and HE incendiary rounds, as well as illumination shells. The two guns were supplied with a total of 3,200 rounds of ammunition.

Close-range anti-aircraft weaponry consisted of twelve  SK C/30 guns and twenty-four to thirty-two  Flak 38 guns. The 3.7 cm gun was a single-shot gun, with a rate of fire of around 30 rounds per minute. They were supplied with 20,000 rounds of ammunition. The 2 cm gun was a magazine-fed automatic weapon, firing at up to 500 rounds per minute. Twenty and forty-round magazines were supplied for the guns; The guns were supplied with 48,000 rounds of ammunition.

The ships' air complement was to have consisted of twelve Bf 109 fighters and twelve Ju 87 Stuka dive-bombers. The Bf 109 fighters were a navalized version of the "E" model, designated as Bf 109T. Their wings were longer than the land-based model to allow for shorter take-off. The Ju 87s were to have been the "E" variant, which was a navalized version of the Ju 87D, and were modified for catapult launches and were equipped with arresting gear.

Footnotes

Notes

Citations

References
 
 
 
 
 
 
 
 

World War II aircraft carriers of Germany
Cancelled aircraft carriers
Aircraft carrier classes
Aircraft carriers of the Kriegsmarine
Proposed ships of Germany